H. Sheldon Parker, Jr. (born April 14, 1938) is a former Republican member of the Pennsylvania House of Representatives.

References

Republican Party members of the Pennsylvania House of Representatives
Living people
1938 births